Too Tough to Tame is the eleventh studio album by American country music artist John Anderson. It was released on August 8, 1989, and was originally on the Universal Records label, which became Capitol Nashville. The album featured the singles "Who's Lovin' My Baby" and "Tryin' to Make a Living on the Road," which was the first Anderson single to not chart since "Swoop Down Sweet Jesus" in 1975.

Track listing
"Too Tough to Tame" - (John Anderson, Max D. Barnes) 2:55
"Guitars That Won't Stay in Tune" (Troy Seals, Eddie Setser) - 2:06
"The Tears That I Cry" -  (Anderson, Paul Kennerley) 3:21
"Tryin' to Make a Living on the Road" (Anderson, Lionel Delmore) - 2:45
"Maybe Go Down" (Paul Overstreet) - 3:45
"Who's Lovin' My Baby" (Curtis Wright) - 3:21
"When the Darkness Falls" (Anderson, Kennerley) - 3:02
"She Worships the Quicksand That I Walk On" (Ken Bell, Tony Stampley) - 2:37
"Bamboo Annie" - (Anderson, Delmore) 2:49
"There Was a Time When I Was Alone" (Anderson, Delmore) - 3:15

Personnel
 Donna Anderson - background vocals
 John Anderson - acoustic guitar, lead vocals, background vocals
 Eddie Bayers - drums
 Glen Hardin - piano
 Mike Jordan - organ, synthesizer
 Vernon Pilder - acoustic guitar
 Buck Reid - steel guitar
 Michael Rhodes - bass guitar
 Joe Spivey - fiddle, mandolin
 Billy Joe Walker Jr. - acoustic guitar, electric guitar
 Deanna Anderson Wall - background vocals
 Curtis Young - background vocals
 Reggie Young - acoustic guitar, electric guitar

Chart

Singles

References

[ Too Tough to Tame], Allmusic.

1989 albums
Capitol Records albums
John Anderson (musician) albums
Albums produced by Jimmy Bowen
Universal Records (1988) albums